Sidon is a surname.

People with the surname
Andreas Sidon (born 1963), German professional boxer fighting in the heavyweight division
Ephraim Sidon (born 1946), Israeli author, playwright and satirist, and writer of children's books 
Karol Sidon (born 1942), Czech rabbi, writer and playwright
Shimon Sidon (1815–1891), Hungarian rabbi
Simon Sidon or Szidon (1892–1941), Hungarian mathematician

People known as "of Sidon"
Abba Gorion of Sidon, a tanna who lived in the second century in Sidon
Antipater of Sidon, Antipatros or Antipatros Sidonios in the Anthologies, a Greek poet in the second half of the 2nd century BC
Boethus of Sidon (c. 75 – c. 10 BC), Peripatetic philosopher from Sidon
Boethus of Sidon (Stoic), (2nd century BC), Stoic philosopher from Sidon
Dorotheus of Sidon (c. 75 CE), Hellenistic astrologer who wrote a didactic poem on horoscopic astrology known in Greek as the Pentateuch
Meges of Sidon (1st century BC), eminent surgeon born at Sidon
Reginald of Sidon (1130s – 1202), Lord of Sidon and an important noble in the  Kingdom of Jerusalem
Zeno of Sidon (c. 150 – c. 75 BC), Epicurean philosopher from the Phoenician city of Sidon